Cluj Expres is a Romanian language free daily newspaper published in Cluj-Napoca.

Newspapers published in Cluj-Napoca
Publications with year of establishment missing